Gizem Memiç ((born May 16, 1990, in Ankara) is a Turkish model and beauty pageant title holder who won the title of Miss Turkey 2010 on Thursday 1 April 2010. Gizem Memiç accepted the crown from Ebru Şam, Miss Turkey 2010. She graduated from  Interior Architecture & Environmental Design at Bilkent University.

Beauty contests

Miss Universe 2010
Memiç competed in Miss Universe 2010 held in Las Vegas, Nevada on August 23, 2010.

Miss World 2010
As the official representative of her country in the 2010 Miss World pageant held in Sanya, China, Memiç became one of the Top 40 semifinalists during the Miss World Beach Beauty fast track event held on October 19 and a Top 20 finalist in Miss World Sports, held on October 22, 2010.

Commercial work
As "Miss Turkey" she was in a 2011 American television commercial for Carl's Jr. restaurant and its sibling Hardee's restaurants, promoting their new broiled turkey burger.  Memiç is seen in a bikini that features small images of the turkey burger. Strolling down a walkway, she is eating one of the burgers.

References

External links
Official Miss Turkey website

1990 births
Living people
Miss Universe 2010 contestants
Miss World 2010 delegates
Miss Turkey winners
People from Ankara
Bilkent University alumni